The flying shuttle was one of the key developments in the industrialization of weaving during the early Industrial Revolution. It allowed a single weaver to weave much wider fabrics, and it could be mechanized, allowing for automatic machine looms. The flying shuttle, which was patented by John Kay (1704 – c. 1779) in 1733, greatly sped up the previous hand process and halved the labor force. Where a broad-cloth loom previously required a weaver on each side, it could now be worked by a single operator. Until this point, the textile industry had required four spinners to service one weaver. Kay's innovation, in wide use by the 1750s, greatly increased this disparity.

History
The history of this device is difficult to accurately ascertain due to poor recordings. Nonetheless, there are two general schools of thought around this; first those that believe that it "appears" to have been invented in the region of Languedoc of southern France (one year before its introduction in England), but was destroyed by state cloth inspectors of the rent-seeking Ancien Regime. On the other side, are those that believe it simply originated where it was industrialized; England.

Operation
In a typical frame loom, as used previous to the invention of the flying shuttle, the operator sat with the newly woven cloth before them, using treadles or some other mechanism to raise and lower the heddles, which opened the shed in the warp threads. They then had to reach forward while holding the shuttle in one hand and pass this through the shed; the shuttle carried a bobbin for the weft. The shuttle then had to be caught in the other hand, the shed closed, and the beater pulled forward to push the weft into place. This action (called a "pick") required regularly bending forward over the fabric; more importantly, the coordination between the throwing and catching of the shuttle required multiple operators if the width of the fabric exceeded that which could be reasonably reached across (typically  or less).

The flying shuttle employs a board, called the "race," which runs, side to side, along the front of the beater, forming a track on which the shuttle runs. The lower threads of the shed rest on the track and the shuttle slides over them. At each end of the race, there is a box which catches the shuttle at the end of its journey, and which contains a mechanism for propelling the shuttle on its return trip. The shuttle itself has some subtle differences from the older form. The ends of the shuttle are bullet-shaped and metal-capped, and the shuttle generally has rollers to reduce friction. The weft thread is made to exit from the end rather than the side, and the thread is stored on a pirn (a long, conical, one-ended, non-turning bobbin) to allow it to feed more easily. Finally, the flying shuttle is generally somewhat heavier, so as to have sufficient momentum to carry it all the way through the shed.

Social effects
The increase in production due to the flying shuttle exceeded the capacity of the spinning industry of the day and prompted the development of powered spinning machines. Beginning with the spinning jenny and the waterframe until ultimately culminating in the spinning mule, which could produce strong, fine thread in the quantities needed these innovations transformed the textile industry in Great Britain. The innovation was seen as a threat to the livelihood of spinners & weavers, which resulted in an uprising that had Kay's patent largely ignored. It is often incorrectly written that Kay was attacked and fled to France, but in fact he simply moved there to attempt to rent out his looms, a business model that had failed him in England.

The flying shuttle produced a new source of injuries to the weaving process; if deflected from its path, it could be shot clear of the machine, potentially striking workers. Turn-of-the-century injury reports abound with instances in which eyes were lost or other injuries sustained and, in several instances (for example, an extended exchange in 1901), the British House of Commons was moved to take up the issue of installing guards and other contrivances to reduce these injuries.

Obsolescence

The flying shuttle dominated commercial weaving through the middle of the twentieth century. However, by that time, other systems had begun to replace it. The heavy shuttle was noisy and energy-inefficient (since the energy used to throw it was largely lost in the catching); also, its inertia limited the speed of the loom. Projectile and rapier looms eliminated the need to take the bobbin/pirn of thread through the shed; later, air- and water-jet looms reduced the weight of moving parts further. Flying shuttle looms are still used for some purposes, and old models remain in use.

References

Weaving equipment
Industrial Revolution